The 1984–85 Toronto Maple Leafs season was the 68th season of the Toronto NHL franchise, 58th season as the Maple Leafs. The Maple Leafs finished last in the Norris Division and in the entire NHL with a record of 20-52-8 for 48 points.

Offseason

NHL Draft

Regular season

Final standings

Schedule and results

Playoffs
 The Maple Leafs did not qualify for the playoffs for the second consecutive season.

Player statistics

Regular season
Scoring

Goaltending

Transactions
The Maple Leafs have been involved in the following transactions during the 1984-85 season.

Trades

Waivers

Free agents

Awards and honors
 Bill Derlago, Molson Cup (Most game star selections for Toronto Maple Leafs)

References
 Maple Leafs on Hockey Database

Toronto Maple Leafs seasons
Toronto Maple Leafs season, 1984-85
Toronto